Lot 32 is a township in Queens County, Prince Edward Island, Canada.  It is part of Charlotte Parish. Lot 32 was awarded to Sir William Young, 1st Baronet in the 1767 land lottery. It was sold for arrears of quitrent in 1781 and a portion was granted to Loyalists in 1783. Lot 32 is the only township in the province not used by Statistics Canada as a census subdivision.

References

32
Geography of Queens County, Prince Edward Island